Wilczyn  is a village in the administrative district of Gmina Grębocice, within Polkowice County, Lower Silesian Voivodeship, in south-western Poland. Before 1945, Wilczyn was in Germany.

References

Wilczyn